Efim Isaakovich Zelmanov (born 7 September 1955 in Khabarovsk) is a Russian-American mathematician, known for his work on combinatorial problems in nonassociative algebra and group theory, including his solution of the restricted Burnside problem. He was awarded a Fields Medal at the International Congress of Mathematicians in Zürich in 1994.

Zelmanov was born into a Jewish family in Khabarovsk, Soviet Union (now in Russia). He entered Novosibirsk State University in 1972, when he was 17 years old. He obtained a doctoral degree at Novosibirsk State University in 1980, and a higher degree at Leningrad State University in 1985. He had a position in Novosibirsk until 1987, when he left the Soviet Union.In 1990 he moved to the United States, becoming a professor at the University of Wisconsin–Madison. He was at the University of Chicago in 1994/5, then at Yale University. In 2011, he became a professor at the University of California, San Diego and a Distinguished Professor at the Korea Institute for Advanced Study. In 2022, he moved to the People's Republic of China and joined the Southern University of Science and Technology in Shenzhen, China. He served as a chair professor and the scientific director of the SUSTech International Center for Mathematics. 

Zelmanov was elected a member of the U.S. National Academy of Sciences in 2001, becoming, at the age of 47, the youngest member of the mathematics section of the academy.
He is also an elected member of the American Academy of Arts and Sciences (1996) and a foreign member of the Korean Academy of Science and Engineering and of the Spanish Royal Academy of Sciences. In 2012 he became a fellow of the American Mathematical Society.

Zelmanov gave invited talks at the International Congress of Mathematicians in Warsaw (1983), Kyoto (1990) and Zurich (1994). He delivered the 2004 Turán Memorial Lectures. He was awarded Honorary Doctor degrees from the University of Alberta, Canada (2011), Taras Shevchenko National University of Kyiv, Ukraine (2012),  the Universidad Internacional Menéndez Pelayo in Santander, Spain (2015) and the University of Lincoln, UK (2016).

Zelmanov's early work was on Jordan algebras in the case of infinite dimensions. He was able to show that Glennie's identity in a certain sense generates all identities that hold. He then showed that the Engel identity for Lie algebras implies nilpotence, in the case of infinite dimensions.

Notable publications
 Zelʹmanov, E.I. Solution of the restricted Burnside problem for groups of odd exponent. Izv. Akad. Nauk SSSR Ser. Mat. 54 (1990), no. 1, 42–59, 221. English translation in Math. USSR-Izv. 36 (1991), no. 1, 41–60. doi:10.1070/IM1991v036n01ABEH001946
 Zelʹmanov, E.I. Solution of the restricted Burnside problem for 2-groups. Mat. Sb. 182 (1991), no. 4, 568–592. English translation in Math. USSR-Sb. 72 (1992), no. 2, 543–565. doi:10.1070/SM1992v072n02ABEH001272

References

External links
 
 
 The Work of Efim Zelmanov (Fields Medal 1994) by Kapil Hari Paranjape.

1955 births
Living people
People from Khabarovsk
Russian Jews
American people of Russian-Jewish descent
20th-century Russian mathematicians
21st-century Russian mathematicians
Algebraists
Fields Medalists
Jewish American scientists
Members of the United States National Academy of Sciences
Soviet mathematicians
University of California, San Diego faculty
Fellows of the American Mathematical Society
Novosibirsk State University alumni
21st-century American Jews